New Phytologist is a peer-reviewed scientific journal published on behalf of the New Phytologist Foundation by Wiley-Blackwell. It was founded in 1902 by botanist Arthur Tansley, who served as editor until 1931.

Topics covered  
New Phytologist covers all aspects of plant science, with topics ranging from intracellular processes through to global environmental change, including:

 Physiology and development: intra/inter-cellular signalling, long-distance signalling, physiology, development, eco-devo - phenotypic plasticity, transport, biochemistry.
 Environment: global change and Earth system functioning, environmental stress, ecophysiology, plant–soil interactions, heavy metals.
 Interaction: multitrophic systems, mycorrhizas and pathogens, fungal genomics, nitrogen-fixing symbioses.
 Evolution: molecular evolution, population genetics, mating systems, phylogenetics, speciation, plant-enemy coevolution.

Article categories 
The journal publishes articles in the following categories:

 Original research articles
 Research reviews
 Commentaries
 Letters
 Meeting reports
 Modelling/Theory and Methods papers
 Tansley reviews
 Tansley insights
 Viewpoints
 Community resources

References

External links 
 Journal Homepage
 New Phytologist Foundation
 New Phytologist at SCImago Journal Rank
 New Phytologist at HathiTrust Digital Library
 New Phytologist at Botanical Scientific Journals

Publications established in 1902
Botany journals
Wiley-Blackwell academic journals